Chen Shiyuan (born 1985) is a Taiwanese professional Go player.

Biography 
He is a 9 dan professional in Taiwan. In 2000, he went to South Korea and studied under Kwon Kab-Ryong. He spent 5 years in Korea, before moving back to Taiwan in 2005.

Promotion record

Career record
2006: 43 wins, 20 losses
2007: 44 wins, 15 losses
2008: 40 wins, 21 losses
2009: 55 wins, 11 losses
2010: 46 wins, 15 losses
2011: 21 wins, 3 losses

Titles and runners-up 

Total: 19 titles, 12 runners-up.

External links
GoBase Profile
Sensei's Library Profile

1985 births
Living people
Taiwanese Go players
Sportspeople from Taipei
Go players at the 2010 Asian Games
Asian Games competitors for Chinese Taipei